Senator Gallus may refer to:

John Gallus (politician) (fl. 2000s–2010s), New Hampshire Senate
Steve Gallus (fl. 1990s–2010s), Montana State Senate